Giacomo Signori (11 June 1914 – 5 February 2005) was an Italian swimmer and water polo player. He won two medals at the 1934 European Aquatics Championships, and at least seven national titles in freestyle swimming events.

As a water polo player, he won three national titles with the Rari Nantes Florentia (1934), Canottieri Olona (1947), and Rari Nantes Camogli (1953) teams. After retiring from competitions, he worked as a swimming coach.

References

1914 births
2005 deaths
People from Desenzano del Garda
Italian male swimmers
Italian male freestyle swimmers
European Aquatics Championships medalists in swimming
Sportspeople from the Province of Brescia